Antonio Tempesta, also called il Tempestino (1555 – 5 August 1630), was an Italian painter and engraver, whose art acted as a point of connection between Baroque Rome and the culture of Antwerp. Much of his work depicts major battles and historical figures.

Life
He was born and trained in Florence and painted in a variety of styles, influenced to some degree by "Counter-Maniera" or Counter-Mannerism. He enrolled in the Florentine Accademia delle Arti del Disegno in 1576.  He was a pupil of Santi di Tito, then of the Flemish painter Joannes Stradanus. He was part of the large team of artists working under Giorgio Vasari on the interior decoration of the Palazzo Vecchio in Florence.

His favourite subjects were battles, cavalcades, and processions. He relocated to Rome, where he associated with artists from the Habsburg Netherlands, which may have led to his facility with landscape painting.

Among his followers was Marzio di Colantonio.

Commissions
Tempesta and the Flemish painter Matthijs Bril were commissioned by Pope Gregory XIII to paint wide panoramas of the Procession to Transfer the Relics of St. Gregory of Nazianzus (1572) for the loggias on the third floor of the Vatican Palace. He completed frescoes in the Palazzina Gambara at the Villa Lante in Bagnaia (1578-1609). From 1579–83, Tempesta participated in the decoration of the Villa Farnese in Caprarola, notably of this villa's Scala Regia. He is also known to have collaborated on frescoes in the Villa d'Este at Tivoli and the Palazzina Gamara at Villa Lante, Bagnaia. He painted a series of turbulent and crowded battle scenes for the Medici. He also completed a series of engravings on outdoor courtly hunting scenes.

Tempesta painted frescoes for the Palazzos Colonna, the Doria Pamphilj, and for the Marchese Giustiniani in his Roman palace, where Tempesta collaborated with Paul Bril, and at Bassano di Sutri. He painted a Massacre of the Innocents for the church of Santo Stefano Rotondo in Rome.

Tempesta is now best known as a printmaker in etching and engraving. He also left numerous etchings, among them: Plates from the Old Testament; twenty-four plates from the Life of St. Anthony;  a set of 150 prints from Ovid’s Metamorphoses; 13 plates on The Labours of Hercules and four plates on respectively The ages of man; The entry of Alexander into Babylon; Diana and Actaon, and The crucifixion (1612).

In 1612 he engraved a series of plates under the title "Batavorum cum Romanis Bellum" after designs of the Netherlandish artist Otto van Veen, also known as Vaenius (1556-1629) and court painter to Alessandro Farnese. Van Veen  was influenced by the Italian mannerists but had developed his own style anticipating the Flemish baroque of his pupil Peter Paul Rubens. The series consists of 36 numbered engraved plates and illustrates the armed struggle between the ancient Dutch tribes and their Roman oppressors as narrated in Tacitus' Histories. Each plate bears at the bottom an engraved legend in Flemish and in Latin while a detailed explanation is printed on the otherwise blank verso.  Plate I, signed 'Ant.Tempesta f. Anno 1611', shows 'Roma' and 'Batavia' in battle dress with respective scenic backgrounds, symbolizing the two nations. Fifteen other plates bear Tempesta's monogram. The plates depict heroic events, sieges, and battle scenes. This historicist work was very popular in its time.

Tempesta also drew many designs for tapestries.

Gallery

Notes

References
 Text from Karel van Mander's Schilderboeck, p. 195: Daer is nae mijnen tijdt, oft noch teghenwoordich te Room, een Florentijn, Discipel van Ioan van der straet, oft Stradanus, geheeten Antonio Tempesta, die seer ghepresen wort, hebbende veel dinghen gheteyckent en ghehetst, als Iachten, Batailgen der Amasones: oock Ao. 1593. in platte forme, en in't groote, de Stadt van Room.
Brief bio of Tempesta from Web Gallery of Art
Grove Art Dictionary
Eckhard Leuschner, Antonio Tempesta. Ein Bahnbrecher des roemischen Barock und seine europaeische Wirkung, Petersberg 2005 (in German).

External links

 Lambiek Comiclopedia article.

1555 births
1630 deaths
16th-century Italian painters
Italian male painters
17th-century Italian painters
Italian Renaissance painters
Italian printmakers
Painters from Florence